Austin Jermaine Wiley (born January 8, 1999) is an American basketball player for Neptūnas Klaipėda of the Lithuanian Basketball League. He played college basketball for the Auburn Tigers.

High school career
Wiley attended Spain Park High School in Hoover, Alabama, where he averaged 27.1 points, 12.7 rebounds and 2.9 blocked shots as a junior in 2015–16, before moving to Florida, where he went to Calusa Preparatory School in Miami, Florida, while playing basketball at The Conrad Academy in Orlando, Florida. He signed a national letter of intent with Auburn on November 9, 2016, following in the footsteps of his parents who both are Auburn alumni. On December 16, 2016, Wiley decided to reclassify into the class of 2016 and enroll early into Auburn.

Wiley was rated as a five-star recruit and the No.27 overall recruit and No.6 center in the 2016 high school class.

College career

Freshman
Wiley made his debut for the Tigers on December 18, 2016, tallying nine points, three rebounds and two blocks in a 76–74 win over Mercer. He finished his freshman year with averages of 8.8 points, 4.7 rebounds and 1.4 blocks in 18 minutes per game.

FBI investigation

Before Auburn's exhibition game on November 2, 2017, the school announced that it would hold Wiley and teammate Danjel Purifoy out of games indefinitely due to eligibility concerns raised over the ongoing FBI investigation into the Chuck Person bribery scandal. On January 12, 2018, the NCAA ruled that Wiley would regain his eligibility in the 2018–19 season, ruling him ineligible for the remainder of the 2017–18 season. Wiley was one of 69 players to enter the 2018 NBA Draft Combine, although he would return to Auburn to properly play for them for at least his junior season.

Junior
As a junior, Wiley averaged 6.9 points, 4.0 rebounds, and 1.3 blocks per game. He was hampered by injuries and underwent surgery after the season. However, he was a part of Auburn's first ever Final Four team.

Senior
Coming into his senior season, Wiley was tabbed as preseason econ Team All-SEC by the coaches and was on the Kareem Abdul-Jabbar Award watchlist. On February 12, 2020, Wiley scored 18 points, grabbed a career-high 17 rebounds, and blocked five shots in a 95–91 overtime win over Alabama. As a senior, Wiley averaged 10.6 points and 9.3 rebounds per game, second in the conference in rebounding.

Professional career
On January 2, 2021, he signed with MHP Riesen Ludwigsburg of the Basketball Bundesliga (BBL). He appeared in one league game for Ludwigsburg, in which he remained scoreless.

Wiley moved to German second division side Gladiators Trier on January 20, 2021. In six league games of the 2020-21 season, he averaged 14.7 points, 8.8 rebounds and 1.8 blocks for the Gladiators.

National team career
Wiley helped Team USA capture gold at the 2016 FIBA under-17 World Championships in Spain and bronze at the 2017 FIBA under-19 World Cup in Egypt.

Career statistics

College

|-
| style="text-align:left;"| 2016–17
| style="text-align:left;"| Auburn
| 23 || 22 || 18.0 || .584 || – || .491 || 4.7 || .2 || .2 || 1.3 || 8.8
|-
| style="text-align:left;"| 2018–19
| style="text-align:left;"| Auburn
| 29 || 5 || 13.0 || .567 || .000 || .571 || 4.0 || .1 || .2 || 1.3 || 6.9
|-
| style="text-align:left;"| 2019–20
| style="text-align:left;"| Auburn
| 31 || 31 || 21.4 || .574 || .000 || .671 || 9.3 || .5 || .5 || 1.6 || 10.6
|- class="sortbottom"
| style="text-align:center;" colspan="2"| Career
| 83 || 58 || 17.5 || .575 || .000 || .592 || 6.2 || .3 || .3 || 1.4 || 8.8

Personal life
He is the son of Vickie Orr, a member of the 1992 US Olympic team and former All-American, and Aubrey Wiley. Both played varsity basketball at Auburn.

References

External links
Auburn Tigers bio
USA Basketball bio

1999 births
Living people
21st-century African-American sportspeople
African-American basketball players
American men's basketball players
Auburn Tigers men's basketball players
Basketball players from Birmingham, Alabama
Centers (basketball)
People from Hoover, Alabama